Peter Berg (born March 11, 1964) is an American director, producer, writer, and actor. His directorial film works include the black comedy Very Bad Things (1998), the action comedy The Rundown (2003), the sports drama Friday Night Lights (2004), the action thriller The Kingdom (2007), the superhero comedy-drama Hancock (2008), the military science fiction war film Battleship (2012), the war film Lone Survivor (2013), the disaster drama Deepwater Horizon (2016), the Boston Marathon bombing drama Patriots Day (2016), the action thriller Mile 22 (2018), and the action comedy Spenser Confidential (2020), the latter five all starring Mark Wahlberg. In addition to cameo appearances in the last six of these titles, he has had prominent acting roles in films including Never on Tuesday (1989), Shocker (1989), The Last Seduction (1994), The Great White Hype (1996), Cop Land (1997), Corky Romano (2001), Collateral (2004), Smokin' Aces (2006), and Lions for Lambs (2007).

In television, Berg created the ABC series Wonderland (2000). He developed the NBC series Friday Night Lights (2006–2011), adapted from his film, earning two Primetime Emmy Award nominations. As an actor, he is best known for his role as Dr. Billy Kronk on the CBS medical drama Chicago Hope (1995–1999).

Early life
Berg was born in 1964 in New York City, the son of Laurence "Larry" Berg, a US Marine, and Sally (née Winkler) Berg. Berg's father was Jewish, as was his maternal grandfather. His mother was Christian.

Through his mother, Berg is a second cousin of writer H. G. Bissinger, whose book Friday Night Lights provided the basis for Berg's film and TV series of the same name. His mother co-founded a youth group named Catalog for Giving and worked at a psychiatric hospital when Berg was growing up. He has a younger sister, Mary.

Peter was a student in the Chappaqua School System. After graduating from The Taft School in 1980, Berg attended Macalester College in Saint Paul, Minnesota, where he majored in theater arts and theater history. He graduated in 1984, and in 1985 moved to Los Angeles to pursue his film career.

Career

Berg put his acting aspirations on hold when he first arrived in Los Angeles, choosing instead to learn about the film business as a production assistant. He acted in 21 Jump Street and Quiet Victory: The Charlie Wedemeyer Story (both in 1988). He acted in Never on Tuesday, Miracle Mile, Race For Glory, Shocker, Heart of Dixie, Tale of Two Sisters and Going Overboard in 1989. He acted in Genuine Risk and Forradalom után in 1990. He appeared in Late for Dinner and Crooked Hearts in 1991. In the early 1990s, he appeared in A Midnight Clear, A Case for Murder, Fire in the Sky, Aspen Extreme, Across the Moon, Uneviled and F.T.W.

In 1992, Berg gained recognition for playing a World War II soldier in the film A Midnight Clear. In 1998, Berg made his feature directorial debut with Very Bad Things, a black comedy starring Jon Favreau, Christian Slater, Jeremy Piven, Daniel Stern, and Leland Orser. The film, which was shown at the Toronto and San Sebastian Film Festivals, received mixed critical reception. In 2000, he created Wonderland, an edgy dramatic television series set in an asylum. While the ABC show received rave reviews and garnered a cult following, it failed to deliver ratings and was quickly canceled.

In 2003, Berg directed the action comedy The Rundown. Starring Dwayne Johnson and Seann William Scott, the film received mixed reviews from critics and disappointed at the box office, only grossing $80 million of its reported $85 million budget. In 2004, Berg began work on his third directorial effort, Friday Night Lights, a football film based on the New York Times bestseller written by Buzz Bissinger. In 2006, Berg developed and became executive producer of NBC’s Peabody and Emmy Award-winning drama Friday Night Lights, which takes inspiration from the book and Berg's film of the same name, but features an original storyline and new characters.

He appeared in the war film Lions for Lambs (2007) as Lt. Colonel Falco. Berg followed up in 2007 with The Kingdom, a Michael Mann-produced action-political thriller set in Saudi Arabia, starring Academy Award winners Jamie Foxx and Chris Cooper, also with Jennifer Garner whom Berg met when he appeared in a two-part episode of Alias where he played Garner's ex-boyfriend. Berg’s film Hancock, starring Will Smith, Charlize Theron and Jason Bateman, was one of the highest grossing films of 2008.

Berg directed the Hulu.com commercial featuring Alec Baldwin, which both The New York Times and Time magazine named best spot of Super Bowl XLIII. In 2009, Berg directed a two-hour pilot movie for a Fox television series Virtuality. Even though the show was not picked up for a full season, the pilot was released on DVD exclusively through Best Buy. Berg also directed the ESPN documentary "Kings Ransom" in 2009. Berg also wrote the film The Losers (2010).

Berg also directed the science-fiction/action film Battleship (2012) and the war film Lone Survivor (2013), an adaptation of Marcus Lutrell's book of the same name. Variety writer Justin Chang said Berg delivered "his most serious-minded work to date with Lone Survivor." The following year, Berg acted as producer on the 2014 film Hercules, which he was originally slated to direct before being replaced by Brett Ratner.

In 2013, Berg created the opening animation sequence for ESPN's Monday Night Football. The 80-second graphic featured Darth Vader, Pac-Man, President Ronald Reagan and some highlights of MNF games from 1970–2012. In 2014, he directed the first two episodes of HBO's The Leftovers.

In 2016, Berg directed the film Deepwater Horizon, based on the Deepwater Horizon explosion. Berg replaced director J. C. Chandor, who had exited the film due to creative differences. That same year, he directed CBS Films' Patriots Day, about the Boston Marathon bombing, and the following year directed the action thriller Mile 22. All three films starred Mark Wahlberg.

In 2017, Berg directed an ambitious commercial for Hyundai, which was recorded after the kickoff of Super Bowl LI and aired right after the game. His Film 44 company was recently signed to a first look deal with Netflix, which saw the release of his most recent film Spenser Confidential, the director's fifth collaboration with Wahlberg.

In 2019, Berg directed a historic commercial for the National Football League, "...football fans witnessed another milestone moment with the premiere of the NFL's Super Bowl commercial entitled The 100-Year Game. The two minute ad, which kicked off the celebration of the NFL's 100th season garnered the No. 1 spot in USA Today's Ad Meter with the publication describing it as "a tour de force starring an assemblage of many of the greats of NFL history."Personal life
In 1993, Berg was married to Elizabeth Rogers; they divorced in 1998. He has one child with her.

 Caitlyn Jenner controversy 
On July 15, 2015, Berg criticized ESPN's decision to honor Caitlyn Jenner with the Arthur Ashe Courage Award with an Instagram post in which he shared a Facebook photo of Army veteran Gregory D. Gadson (a double amputee who played a role in Berg’s Battleship film) alongside one of Jenner. It said: "One Man traded 2 legs for the freedom of the other to trade 2 balls for 2 boobs. Guess which Man made the cover of Vanity Fair, was praised for his courage by President Obama and is to be honored with the 'Arthur Ashe Courage Award' by ESPN?"'' Along with the shared post, Berg commented, "Yup."

Berg received both praise and condemnation for the post. He later said he had the utmost respect for Jenner and transgender individuals but 
released another photo with statistics on veterans suicides, stating, "I also believe that we don't give enough attention to our courageous returning war veterans, many of whom have sacrificed their bodies and mental health for our country and our principals [sic] – principals that include the freedom to live the life you want to live without persecution or abuse."

Filmography

Film

Acting roles

Television

Acting roles

Music videos

Awards and nominations

References

External links

Peter Berg's KCRW Guest DJ Set
The New York Times: Wonderland

Taft School alumni
1964 births
Jewish American male actors
Male actors from New York City
American male film actors
Film directors from New York City
American male television actors
American television directors
American television writers
American male television writers
Living people
Macalester College alumni
20th-century American male actors
21st-century American male actors
Showrunners
Screenwriters from New York (state)
Action film directors
American music video directors